Mankombu Gopalakrishnan is an Indian film lyricist, poet and script writer in Malayalam movies. 

He has written more than 700 songs for about 200 Malayalam movies. He has also done story, screenplay and dialogue for more than 10 Malayalam movies.

Selected filmography

Lyrics
 Lakshrchana Kandu (Film :Ayalathe sundari)
 Thrayampakam vilodinju (Film :Ayalathe Sundadi) 
 Chithra Varna pushppathalam (Film:Ayalathe sundae)
 Ilamulla Poove Idanenjin (Lady Teacher)
 Naadan pattinte (film: Babu mon)
 Ashada madam (film:yudha bhoomi
 Raja suyam kazinju (film:Ambili Ammavan) 
 sharapanjarathin ullil (film :Karanaparavam) 
 Kalidasante kavyabhavanaye (film: sujatha) 
 Thallippu ... Peelippu (film: sujatha) 
 Ashritha valsarare (film:sujatha)
 Swyamvara Subhadina Mangalangal (film: Sujatha)
 Alila thoniyil (film:Avalkku maranamilla) 
 Ashtta Mangalaya suprabhatham (film: chennai valarthiya kutty)
 Velicham villakanchu (film: yagaswayam)
 thozuki nette unarum (film:Boing Boing) 
 Nadhagalayi neevaru (film: Ninnishtam Ennishtam)
 Ilam manjin Kulirumayoru kuyil (Film:Ninnishtam Ennishtam) 
 Bhagavathi Kavil (film:Mayuukham)
 Ee puzayum (film: Mayuukham) 
 Mukil Varna mukunda (film:Bahubali 2)
 "Priyam", "Karinthol", "Janani", "Komuram Bheemano", "Etthuka Jenda", "Komba Ninn Kaada" from RRR

Dialogue
 Swarnnavigraham (1974)
 Swarnna Malsyam (1975)
 Kuttavum Shikshayum (1976)
 Sakhaakkale Munnottu (1977)
 Ival Ee Vazhi Ithu vare (1980)
 Ankachamayam (1982)
 Chuvanna Pushpam (1982)
 Sapadham (1984)
 Sangeetha Sangamam (1988)
 48 Manikkoor (1990)
 Yuvashakthi (1997)
 Popcorn (2003)
Target (2005)
 Glamour Nagaram (2008)
 Company (2002)
 Drona (2009)
 Honeymoon (2009)
 Kilimozhi Kinaaram  (2010)
 Kaalidaas (2010)
 Police Academy (2011)
 Sri Rama Rajyam (2012)
 Life Style (2012)
 Veera (2013)
 Dheera (2013)
 Eecha (2013)
 Baahubali: The Beginning (2015)
 Baahubali: The Conclusion (2017)
 Yathra - Telugu Dubbed (2019)
 RRR (2022)

Story
 Swarnnavigraham (1974)
 Ival Ee Vazhi Ithu vare (1980)
 Ee Mazha Thenmazha (2000)
 Njaan Anaswaran (2013)

Screenplay
 Swarnnavigraham (1974)
 Sakhaakkale Munnottu (1977)
 Ival Ee Vazhi Ithu vare'' (1980)

References

External links

Malayalam screenwriters
Malayalam-language lyricists
Living people
Screenwriters from Kerala
Writers from Alappuzha
1947 births